Staple may refer to:
Staple food, a foodstuff that forms the basic constituent of a diet
Staple (fastener), a small formed metal fastener
Surgical staple

Arts, entertainment, and media
Staple (band), a Christian post-hardcore band
Staple (2002 album), an album by Staple
Staple (2004 album), an album by Staple
Staple (EP), a 2003 EP by Staple
STAPLE!, a convention for creators of comics and other independent media
"Staple Singers/ Freda Payne", a Soul Train episode
The Staple Singers, an American gospel, soul and R&B singing group
The Staple Swingers, a 1971 soul album by the Staple Singers

Brands and enterprises
Merchants of the Staple, an English company which controlled the export of wool to the continent during the late medieval period
Staple Design, a visual communications agency

Fibers
Staple (textiles), the raw material of fiber from which textiles are made
Staple (wool), wool fibers that naturally form themselves into locks

Places
Staple, Kent, a village in Kent, England near Sandwich
Staple railway station, serving the village of Staple
Staple, Nord, a commune in the Nord department in northern France
Staple Bend Tunnel, constructed between 1831 and 1834 for the Allegheny Portage Railroad about four miles east of Johnstown, Pennsylvania
Staple Fitzpaine,  a village and civil parish in Somerset, England
Staple Island, a small rocky island in the Farne Islands in Northumberland, England

Trade
Staple right, a medieval right of certain German ports to require merchant vessels to unload and display their goods for sale for a certain period, often three days
Statute of the Staple, a statute passed in 1353 by the Parliament of England
The Staple, in English historiography, the entire medieval system of trade and its taxation

Other uses
Staple financing, a form of financing package offered to potential bidders during an acquisition
Staple Inn, in London, England, the last surviving Inn of Chancery

See also
Staple Hill (disambiguation)
Stapleford (disambiguation), a number of places in the United Kingdom
Staples (disambiguation)